María Delfina Thome Gustavino (born 10 September 1996) is an Argentine field hockey player.

Hockey career 
Thome Gustavino took her first steps at the Los Tordos Rugby Club. Later, thanks to the influence of Marcela Bracelli, Delfina continued her career at the Liceo Rugby Club, her current club. 

Shell was part of the Argentina Junior National Team at the 2014 Youth Olympics where the team won the bronze medal.

This year she is playing with the National Team "Las Leonas", the FIH Pro League.

References

Living people
1996 births
Argentine female field hockey players
Field hockey players at the 2014 Summer Youth Olympics
Sportspeople from Mendoza, Argentina
Competitors at the 2022 South American Games
South American Games silver medalists for Argentina
South American Games medalists in field hockey
21st-century Argentine women